The 1996 AXA Equity & Law League was the twenty-eighth competing of English cricket's Sunday League.  The competition was won for the first time by Surrey County Cricket Club.

Standings

Batting averages

Bowling averages

See also
Sunday League

References

AXA
Pro40